Whoa, Be-Gone! is a 1958 Warner Bros. Merrie Melodies cartoon directed by Chuck Jones. The short was released on April 12, 1958, and stars Wile E. Coyote and the Road Runner.

Eddie Selzer, who produced all of Warner Bros. cartoons since September 1944, retired in 1958. Whoa, Be-Gone! was the final cartoon he produced. John W. Burton took over after this release.

Plot
Wile E. Coyote (Famishius Vulgaris Ingeniusi) and the Road Runner (Birdius High-Ballius) continue their game of cat and mouse. Over the title cards, the Coyote chases down the Road Runner with a rocket, but before he can deliver the final blow, he hits his head on a tunnel arch as the Road Runner goes through it. The Road Runner escapes and the rocket makes an U-turn toward its owner. Wile E. dodges from the rocket, but ironically, is hit by an ACME truck.

1. Wile E. is pacing around a mountaintop when he runs directly into the Road Runner, who beeps and causes the Coyote's head to retract after being scared into a rock ceiling. The Coyote chases after the bird through a cloud of dust, but only manages to throw himself into thin air. The Road Runner alerts the Coyote, who promptly falls into the canyon with an angry arm-folded glare. He manages to climb back up the mountain again, but no sooner does he do so than the Road Runner, on another plateau, beeps again.

2. The Coyote uses a see-saw and rock to attempt to launch himself towards the Road Runner, but the rock breaks through the cliff's edge, and the Coyote slides from the top of the board down and through the hole. He falls into almost the same spot as the first time, creating a cross of coyote imprints in the ground.

3. The Coyote patches up a trampoline on the desert ground and then proceeds to man a sniper rifle. He hears the Road Runner's beep, but doesn't see him approaching. He turns around to find the bird right behind him. So he turns the rifle around, but there's no space on the other side. Wile E. falls off the cliff again, smiling because he thinks the trampoline will save him. He busts directly through it, though.

4. The Coyote has now ordered a giant rubber band and ties it around two rocks, hoping to trap the Road Runner. However, it is so elastic that it pulls the two rocks together while Wile E. is still in between them.

5. Now, Wile E. lights a bunch of fireworks inside a barrel and bungee-swings the barrel out into open space above the road which the Road Runner is about to pass. But the very edge of the rock that Wile E. is standing on breaks off, causing the Coyote to swing directly below the barrel. As the rope begins to snap, Wile E. climbs up to escape the calamity, but fails to make it off in time. He falls to the ground and is smashed by the barrel. Now, the Coyote has to escape his own security measure, a nailed-shut lid. Wile E. manages to hammer off all the nails and climb out of the barrel, then hide and wait for the explosion. However, he forgot to check the fireworks on the lid, which Wile E. is still wearing!

6. Next, Wile E. builds a high wire structure and dons a wheel-head. He struggles to get himself balanced upside-down on top of the wire (even after the Road Runner is long gone), and when he finally is able to let go of the rock, the wire (predictably) snaps, sending Wile E. crashing headfirst into the ground. Then, the wire drapes over a power line while one end falls into the Coyote's hole, resulting in the Coyote incurring a violent electrical shock.

7. The Coyote now attaches TNT to the bottom of a high bridge as he waits on the ground with the controller. The Road Runner moves towards the intended target, but stops short of the bridge. The bridge detonates and the concrete falls directly upon the poor Coyote.

8. Wile E.'s final plan involves ACME Tornado Seeds in hopes of trapping the Road Runner. After a quick test with a cactus, Wile E. drops a handful of seeds into the road just before the Road Runner turns up. However, he gets trapped by a tornado, which drags the Coyote into an army mine field. Wile E. suffers explosion after explosion as the Road Runner pulls down the "That's All Folks!" end-title card like a curtain.

Crew
Story: Michael Maltese
Animation: Ken Harris, Abe Levitow, Richard Thompson, Ben Washam, Keith Darling
Layouts: Maurice Noble
Backgrounds: Philip DeGuard
Effects Animator: Harry Love
Film Editor: Treg Brown
Vocal Characterizations: Paul Julian (uncredited)
Music Score: Milt Franklyn
Directed By: Chuck Jones

See also
 Looney Tunes and Merrie Melodies filmography (1950–1959)

References

1958 animated films
1958 short films
1950s Warner Bros. animated short films
Merrie Melodies short films
American animated short films
Short films directed by Chuck Jones
Wile E. Coyote and the Road Runner films
Films scored by Milt Franklyn
Animated films without speech
Films with screenplays by Michael Maltese
Films produced by Edward Selzer
Films about Canis
Animated films about mammals
Animated films about birds